Ray Harvey (28 July 1929 – 17 September 2003) was an Australian rules footballer who played with Melbourne in the Victorian Football League (VFL).

Harvey won the best and fairest award in the Melbourne thirds (junior) team in 1948. He only played two games in 1949, kicking two goals in his debut match, before requesting a transfer to Prahran Football Club in the Victorian Football Association.

Harvey played his first 142 games consecutively and won four Prahran best and fairest awards.

In 2003, he was selected in Prahran's Team of the Century.

Notes

External links 

Demonwiki profile

1929 births
Australian rules footballers from Victoria (Australia)
Melbourne Football Club players
Prahran Football Club players
2003 deaths